This is a list of all the commercial nuclear reactors in the European Union and in Europe, with operational status. The list only includes civilian nuclear power reactors used to generate electricity for a power grid. All commercial nuclear reactors use nuclear fission. As of May 2021, there are 180 operable power reactors in Europe (Eastern and Western Europe Combined), with a combined electrical capacity of 159.36 GW. There are currently 8 power reactors under construction in Europe.

Austria

Belarus

Belgium

Bulgaria

Czech Republic

Finland

France

Germany

Hungary

Italy

Lithuania

Netherlands

Poland

Romania

Slovakia

Slovenia

Spain

Sweden

Switzerland

Ukraine

United Kingdom

References 

Nuclear power stations in Europe